The 2000 Taça de Angola was the 19th edition of the Taça de Angola, the second most important and the top knock-out football club competition following the Girabola. Petro de Luanda beat Inter de Luanda 1-0 in the final to secure its 7th title.

Inter de Luanda, the runner-up, qualified to the African Cup Winners' Cup since Petro de Luanda, the winner, contested the CAF Champions League in their capacity as the Girabola winner.

Stadiums and locations

Championship bracket
The knockout rounds were played according to the following schedule:
 Mar 15 - Feb 24: preliminary rounds
 Jun 20 - 28: Round of 16
 Aug 2 - 3: Quarter-finals
 Sep 6: Semi-finals
 Nov 11: Final

Preliminary rounds

Round 1

1/16 finals

Quarter-finals

Semi-finals

Final

See also
 2000 Girabola
 2001 Angola Super Cup
 2001 African Cup Winners' Cup
 Sonangol do Namibe players
 Inter de Luanda players

External links
 profile at rsssf.com

References

Angola Cup
Taca de Angola
Taca de Angola